Peter von Matt (born 20 May 1937) is a Swiss philologist and author.

Life
Born in Lucerne, Peter von Matt grew up in Stans in the canton of Nidwalden.  He studied Art History as well as German and English studies in Zurich and received a doctorate with Emil Staiger on Franz Grillparzer.  In 1970, he received his post doctorate lecturing qualifications with a work on E. T. A. Hoffmann.

From 1976 to 2002, von Matt taught at the University of Zurich as a Professor of Newer German Literature.  He was a guest professor at Stanford University in 1980 and a Fellow of the Institute for Advanced Study, Berlin in 1992/93.  Von Matt is a member of the Deutsche Akademie für Sprache und Dichtung, the Berlin-Brandenburg Academy of Sciences and Humanities, and the Sächsische Akademie der Künste (Saxon Academy of the Arts).  He writes regular contributions for the Frankfurter Anthologie.  He is married to literary critic Beatrice von Matt-Albrecht and lives with her in Dübendorf near Zurich.

Works
 
 
 )
 )
 )
 
 
 )
 The Wild and the Ordered.  About German Literature)
 )
  Winner of the 2012 Swiss Book Prize.

Thesis
 )

Awards

1991: Johann Heinrich Merck Prize for Literary Critque and Essay
1994: Johann-Peter-Hebel-Preis
1995: Innerschweizer Kulturpreis (Innerswiss Culture Prize)
1997: Order of Pour le Mérite for Science and Art
1998: Prize of the Frankfurter Anthologie
2000: Art Prize of the City of Zurich
2001: Friedrich Märker Prize for Essayists
2002: Prix Européen de l'Essai Charles Veillon (Lausanne)
2004: Deutscher Sprachpreis (German Language Prize)
2006: Heinrich Mann Prize
2007: Brothers Grimm Prize of the University of Marburg
2012: Swiss Book Prize for Das Kalb vor der Gotthardpost
2014: Goethe Prize

External links
 
Literature by and on Peter von Matt in the Catalog of the German National Library
Entry about Peter von Matt in the Writers Lexicon of the Association Authors of Switzerland (German)

1937 births
Living people
Academic staff of the University of Zurich
Germanists
Recipients of the Pour le Mérite (civil class)
Heinrich Mann Prize winners
Members of the Academy of Arts, Berlin
People from Dübendorf
Swiss Book Prize winners